The Play-offs of the 2004 Fed Cup Europe/Africa Zone Group II were the final stages of the Group I Zonal Competition involving teams from Europe and Africa. Using the positions determined in their pools, the nine teams faced off to determine their placing in the 2004 Fed Cup Europe/Africa Zone Group II. The top two teams advanced to Group I for next year, and the bottom two teams were relegated down to the Europe/Africa Zone Group III.

Promotion play-offs
The first and second placed teams of each pool were placed against each other in two head-to-head rounds. The winner of the rounds advanced to Group I.

Great Britain vs. Ireland

Romania vs. Luxembourg

Fifth
As there was only four teams from Pool A as opposed to the five from Pool B, the third-placed team from Pool B had no equivalent to play against. Thus the Latvians were automatically allocated fifth place.

Relegation play-offs
The last and second-to-last placed teams of each pool were placed against each other in two head-to-head rounds. The losing team of the rounds were relegated to Group III for next year.

Turkey vs. Finland

Egypt vs. Georgia

Final Placements

  and  advanced to Group I, where they placed eleventh and ninth respectively.

See also
Fed Cup structure

References

External links
 Fed Cup website

2004 Fed Cup Europe/Africa Zone